Ivan Morozov may refer to:

Ivan Morozov (businessman) (1871–1921), Russian businessman and art collector
Ivan Morozov (ice hockey) (born. 2000), Russian ice hockey player
Ivan Morozov (major general) (1905–1979), Russian Red Army general
Ivan Vikulovich Morozov (1865–1933), Russian businessman